The Tiny Tafel format  [tye-nee tahf-uhl] provides a compact way of describing the main surnames found in a family genealogy, which can be read by humans and matched by computers using a Tafel Matching System. The Tiny Tafel lists the Soundex encoded representation of each surname (to allow for matching surnames with spelling variations), accompanied by a corresponding range of dates and locations associated with the surname. Many genealogy programs can produce Tiny Tafel reports. Tiny Tafels were traditionally posted to public forums, such as a BBS (Bulletin Board System) and are still regularly used today with a number of internet sites that provide a Tafel Matching System, in order to indicate whether two genealogical databases have a probable connection or overlap.

Paul Andereck, former editor of Genealogical Computing magazine, proposed the idea and the specification was developed by Commsoft in 1986.

Example

References

External links 
 Tiny Tafel Tutorial – Roots & Branches

Computer file formats
Genealogy software